Harold Laverne Smith (June 30, 1902 – September 27, 1992) was a Major League Baseball pitcher who played with the Pittsburgh Pirates from 1932 to 1935. Appearing in 51 games, he compiled a 12–11 record, posting a 3.77 earned run average, striking out 59, while walking 52.

References

External links

1902 births
1992 deaths
Major League Baseball pitchers
Baseball players from Iowa
Pittsburgh Pirates players
People from Creston, Iowa